Hibran, also spelled Hebran or Hubran, is a village in southern Syria, administratively part of the Suwayda Governorate, located south of Suwayda. According to the Syria Central Bureau of Statistics (CBS), Hibran had a population of 3,166 in the 2004 census.

History
It had a population of 23  households and 14 bachelors; all Muslim. They paid a fixed tax-rate of 40%  on various  agricultural products, including wheat (=1500  akçe), barley (900), summer crops (900), goats and beehives (100); a total of 3,400 akçe. 

Ottoman tax records indicate the revenues of Hibran were farmed out to Muhammad Alam al-Din, a Druze emir who fled Mount Lebanon in 1667, in 1669–1671.

According to the historian Kais Firro, Hibran was one of twenty-eight villages in the Hauran settled by Druze before 1812; in 1838 Hibran was noted as  Druse village by Eli Smith. 

The Druze chieftain Ismail al-Atrash encouraged further Druze migration to Hibran, among a number of other Hauran villages, from Mount Lebanon in the 1850s.

References

Bibliography

 

Populated places in as-Suwayda District
Druze communities in Syria